14, Fabian Road is a 2008 Spanish film directed by Jaime de Armiñán which stars Julieta Cardinali and Ana Torrent.

Plot 
The fiction follows Camila, an Argentine best-selling fiction author with a reported writer's block who is gently kidnapped by a purported fan (Vega) upon making a trip to Spain. Camila is thereby taken to an isolated hostal in Extremadura managed by Palmira so she can write a new novel. Rather than a fan, Vega turns out to be seeking revenge, whilst Camila, rather than a novelist, is a marketing façade to sell novels.

Cast

Production 
The screenplay was co-written by Jaime de Armiñán and his son Eduardo. The film is a Lula Cine production and it had the participation of Telemadrid. It was shot in Extremadura, including Mérida.

Release 
14, Fabian Road premiered at the 11th Málaga Film Festival's official selection on 11 April 2008. It was theatrically released in Spain on 21 November 2008.

Reception 
Jonathan Holland of Variety assessed that the film "is, at its heart, gripping, but wobbly around the edges".

Accolades 

|-
| align = "center" | 2008 || 11th Málaga Film Festival || Jaime de Armiñán, Eduardo de Armiñán || Silver Biznaga for Best Original Screenplay ||  || 
|}

See also 
 List of Spanish films of 2008

References 

2000s Spanish-language films
Films directed by Jaime de Armiñán
Films set in Spain
Films shot in Extremadura
Films about writers
Spanish films about revenge
Films about kidnapping